Denzil B. Atkinson  was a prominent leader of the Anglo-Indian community in India. He was a Member of Parliament, representing Anglo-Indian reserved seats in the Lok Sabha the lower house of India's Parliament as a member of the Bharatiya Janata Party. He is survived by wife Maureen Atkinson married in 1965, with 4 sons, 3 daughters and 10 grandchildren.

References

Nominated members of the Lok Sabha
Bharatiya Janata Party politicians from Telangana
1945 births
2015 deaths
People from Hyderabad, India